Kaniža is a settlement in the Slovene Hills in the Municipality of Šentilj in northeastern Slovenia.

Businesses
The only restaurant in this town is Dvorec Rustina/Prima Estetik. A bar located in this region is Bar Nina, Nina Melek s.p. There are four bus stops along 437 in Kaniža.

References

External links 
Kaniža on Geopedia

Populated places in the Municipality of Šentilj